Ta Veaeng (also transliterated Ta Veng) is a district located in Ratanakiri Province, in north-east Cambodia. It is the northernmost district in Cambodia, protruding between Laos and Vietnam.

Communes

Ta Veaeng Leu

Ta Veaeng Leu contains ten villages and has a population of 2,399.  In the 2007 commune council elections, all five seats for Ta Veaeng Leu went to members of the Cambodian People's Party. Land alienation is a problem of moderate severity in Ta Veaeng Leu. (See Ratanakiri Province for background information on land alienation.)

Ta Veaeng Kraom
Ta Veaeng Kraom contains ten villages and has a population of 1,926.  In the 2007 commune council elections, all five seats for Ta Veaeng Kraom went to members of the Cambodian People's Party. Land alienation is a problem of moderate severity in Ta Veaeng Kraom. (See Ratanakiri Province for background information on land alienation.)

References

Districts of Ratanakiri province